The name Harrowden may refer to:
Places in England
Harrowden, Bedfordshire, a hamlet
Great Harrowden, a village in Northamptonshire
Little Harrowden, a village in Northamptonshire
Peerage titles
Baron Vaux of Harrowden, a title in the Peerage of England` created in 1523 for Sir Nicholas Vaux